The 2019 Adriatica Ionica Race was a five-stage men's professional road cycling race.

It was the second edition of the Adriatica Ionica Race. The race started on 24 July and finished on 28 July.

The race is part of the UCI Europe Tour, and is categorised by the UCI as a 2.1 race. In his absence, Ukrainian Mark Padun won the race.

Teams
Nineteen teams of up to seven riders took part in the race:

UCI WorldTeams

 
 
 
 
 
 
 
 

UCI Professional Continental teams

 
 
 
 
 
 
 
 
 

UCI Continental teams

 

National Teams

 Italy

Route
The race consisted of five stages totalling .

Stages

Stage 1
24 July 2019 - Mestre, Venice, criterium

Though jerseys were awarded after the stage, the times and points accrued during this stage did not count towards the classifications.

Stage 2
25 July 2019 - Venice (Favaro Veneto) to Grado,

Stage 3
26 July 2019 - Palmanova to Lake Misurina,

Stage 4
27 July 2019 - Padola to Cormòns (Monte Quarin),

Stage 5
28 July 2019 - Cormòns to Trieste,

Classification leadership
In the 2019 Adriatica Ionica Race, five jerseys were awarded. The general classification was calculated by adding each cyclist's finishing times on each stage. Time bonuses were awarded to the first three finishers on all stages apart from the time trial stage. The first three riders would get 10, 6, and 4 seconds, respectively. The leader of the general classification received a blue jersey sponsored by Geo&tex2000. This classification was considered the most important of the 2018 Adriatica Ionica, and the winner of the classification was considered the winner of the race.

The second classification was the points classification. Riders were awarded points for finishing in the top ten in a stage. Points were also won in intermediate sprints; ten points for crossing the sprint line first, six points for second place, three for third, two for fourth, and a single point for fifth. The leader of the points classification was awarded a red jersey sponsored by Full Speed Ahead.

The third classification was the mountains classification. Points were awarded to the riders that reached the summit of the most difficult climbs first. The climbs were categorized, in order of increasing difficulty, as third-, second-, and first-category and hors catégorie (read: "beyond category"). The leadership of the mountains classification was marked by a green sponsored by Dolomiti.

The fourth jersey represented the young rider classification, marked by a white jersey sponsored by Gabetti. Only riders born after 1 January 1993 were eligible; the young rider best placed in the general classification was the leader of the young rider classification.

The final classification was the "Fighting Spirit Prize" given after each stage to the rider considered, by a jury, to have "who struggled in order to achieve results in all the competitive moments of the race or the one who take action to start or carry out the longest breakaway". The winner wore an orange jersey sponsored by Suzuki. There was also a classification for teams, in which the times of the best three cyclists in a team on each stage were added together; the leading team at the end of the race was the team with the lowest cumulative time.

 In stage 3, Florian Sénéchal, who was second in the points classification, wore the red jersey, because first placed Álvaro José Hodeg wore the blue jersey as leader of the general classification.
 In stage 3, Rui Oliveira, who was second in the best young rider classification, wore the white jersey, because first placed Álvaro José Hodeg wore the blue jersey as leader of the general classification.
 In stage 4, Nicola Conci, who was second in the best young rider classification, wore the white jersey, because first placed Mark Padun wore the blue jersey as leader of the general classification.
 In stage 5, Nicola Conci, who was third in the best young rider classification, wore the white jersey, because first placed Mark Padun wore the blue jersey as leader of the general classification and second placed Remco Evenepoel wore the red jersey as leader of the points classification.

Final standings

General classification

Points classification

Mountains classification

Young rider classification

Team classification

References

Sources

 

Adriatica Ionica
Adriatica Ionica
Adriatica Ionica Race